Economic activity rate, EAR (or labor force participation rate, LFPR), is the percentage of the population, both employed and unemployed, that constitutes the workforce, regardless of whether they are currently employed or job searching.

This figure is a measure of the degree of success of the economy in engaging the population in some form of production of services or goods.

References

Workforce
Rates

es:Población activa#Tasa de actividad
fr:Population active#Taux d'activité